Michelle Conway (born 24 November 1983) is a Canadian gymnast. She competed at the 2000 Summer Olympics.

References

External links
 

1983 births
Living people
Canadian female artistic gymnasts
Olympic gymnasts of Canada
Gymnasts at the 2000 Summer Olympics
Gymnasts from Toronto
Pan American Games medalists in gymnastics
Pan American Games gold medalists for Canada
Pan American Games silver medalists for Canada
Gymnasts at the 1999 Pan American Games
20th-century Canadian women
21st-century Canadian women